Edsel is a discontinued division and brand of automobiles that was marketed by the Ford Motor Company from the 1958 to the 1960 model years. Deriving its name from Edsel Ford, son of company founder Henry Ford, Edsels were developed in an effort to give Ford a fourth brand to gain additional market share from Chrysler and General Motors. Established as an expansion of the Lincoln-Mercury Division to three brands (re-christened the Mercury-Edsel-Lincoln Division), Edsel shared a price range with Mercury; the division shared its bodies with both Mercury and Ford.

Competing against Buick, Oldsmobile, Pontiac, Dodge, and DeSoto, Edsel was the first new brand introduced by an American automaker since the 1939 launch of Mercury and 1956 launch of Continental, which ended and merged into Lincoln after 1957.  In the year leading to its release, Ford invested in an advertising campaign, marketing Edsels as the cars of the future. While 1958 Edsels introduced multiple advanced features for the price segment, the launch of the model line became symbolic of commercial failure. Introduced in a recession that catastrophically affected sales of medium-priced cars, Edsels were considered overhyped, unattractive (distinguished by a vertical grille), and low quality.

Following a loss of over $250 million ($ in  dollars) on development, manufacturing, and marketing on the model line, Ford quietly discontinued the Edsel brand before 1960.

History

Background (1956–1957)
Ford Motor Company became a publicly traded corporation on January 17, 1956, and thus was no longer entirely owned by members of the Ford family.  The company was now able to sell cars according to current market trends following the seller's market of the postwar years. Ford's new management compared the company's roster of makes with that of General Motors  and Chrysler, and concluded that Lincoln was competing not with Cadillac, but with Oldsmobile, Buick, and DeSoto. Ford developed a plan to move Lincoln upmarket, with the Continental broken out as a separate make at the top of Ford's product line, and to add premium/intermediate vehicles to the intermediate slot vacated by Lincoln.

Marketing research and development for the new intermediate line had begun in 1955 under the code name "E car", which stood for "experimental car." Ford Motor Company eventually decided on the name "Edsel", in honor of Edsel Ford, son of the company's founder, Henry Ford despite objections from Edsel's son Henry Ford II. The proposed vehicle marque would represent the start-up of a new division of the firm alongside that of Ford itself and the Lincoln-Mercury division, whose cars at the time shared the same bodies.

Ford later claimed to have performed more than adequate, if not superior, product development and market research work in the planning and design of the new vehicle.  Ford assured its investors, and the Detroit automotive press, that Edsels were not only superior products (as compared to their Oldsmobile/Buick/DeSoto competition), but the details of their styling and specifications were the result of a sophisticated market analysis and research and development effort that would essentially guarantee their broad acceptance by the buying public when the cars were introduced.

In November 1956, the Edsel Division of Ford Motor Company was formed to establish a retail organization and dealer network, alongside Ford and Lincoln-Mercury (the Continental Division had ceased to exist several months earlier).  With a network of 1,187 Edsel dealers, Ford Motor Company now had approximately 10,000 dealerships between its three divisions, bringing it closer in line with Chrysler (10,000 dealers across five brands) and General Motors (16,000 across six brands).

E Day introduction 
Edsels were introduced amid considerable publicity on "E Day"—September 4, 1957. They were also promoted by a top-rated television special, The Edsel Show, on October 13, but the promotional effort was not enough to counter the adverse initial public reaction to Edsel styling and unconventional build.

After the launch date, Edsel was described as a "reborn LaSalle," a General Motors brand that had disappeared in 1940.  For months, Ford had been telling the industry press that it "knew" (through its market research) that there would be great demand for the vehicles.  Ford also insisted that, in the Edsels, it had built exactly the "entirely new kind of car" that Ford had been leading the buying public to expect through its pre-introduction publicity campaign for the cars. In reality, however, Edsels shared their engineering and bodywork with other Ford models, and the similarities were apparent once the vehicles were viewed firsthand.

Models

1958 

For its inaugural model year, Edsel introduced a seven-model product line, including four sedans and three station wagons.  The lower-trim Edsel Ranger and Edsel Pacer shared bodies with Ford Fairlane sedans ( wheelbase) while the higher-trim Edsel Corsair and Edsel Citation shared bodies with the Mercury Monterey and Mercury Montclair sedans ( wheelbase).  Sharing its body and  wheelbase with Ford station wagons, Edsel offered the two-door Edsel Roundup and the four-door Edsel Villager and Edsel Bermuda.

The Edsel model line offered multiple design features that were considered innovative for the time.  In place of a horizontal strip or a round dial, the speedometer was a rotating dome; in line with aircraft design, the dashboard adopted warning lights for conditions as low oil level, parking brake engaged, and engine overheating.  While not equipped with cruise control, Edsel introduced a speed warning on the speedometer if the driver exceeded a preset speed limit.  While a standard column-mounted transmission shifter was offered (as a delete option), Edsel marked the introduction of the Teletouch push-button shifting system (mounted in the steering wheel hub).

Edsels also integrated many elements of the Ford Lifeguard safety package into its design.  Along with optional seatbelts, Edsels featured a deep-dish steering wheel, double-latched doors, and childproof rear door locks; the model line was among the first to introduce remote-operated trunk opening and self-adjusting brakes.

In the first year, 63,110 Edsels were sold in the United States, and 4,935 were sold in Canada. Though below expectations, this nevertheless represented the second-largest launch for any new car brand to date, exceeded only by the DeSoto introduction in 1929. There was one four-door Citation model purchased and delivered in October 1957 to the United Kingdom for Ian Russell, 13th Duke of Bedford. Its current whereabouts is unknown.  In January 1958, the free-standing Edsel division was added to Lincoln-Mercury, with the re-christened Mercury-Edsel-Lincoln Division (M-E-L) adopting Edsel sales and marketing operations.  As the model year progressed and sales fell under expectations, multiple Edsel-only dealers closed or expanded their brand offerings with the encouragement of Ford Motor Company, including Lincoln-Mercury or imported Ford of Britain and Ford of Germany franchises.

1959 

For the 1959 model year, Ford revised the market position of Edsel, slotting it between Ford and Mercury. To reflect the marketing change, the Mercury-based Citation was withdrawn and the Corsair became a higher-trim version of the Ranger (the Pacer was also discontinued); the station wagon line was pared down to the Villager wagon (dropping the two-door Roundup and wood-trim Bermuda).

In response to the widely negative response to 1958 Edsel exteriors, the exterior of 1959 Edsels underwent a restyling to tone down its appearance.  While the vertical center grille made its return (following heavy revision), a redesign of the hoodline integrated the headlamps into a full-width outer grille (visually lowering the hoodline).  A similar revision of the rear fascia repositioned the taillamps.  Being based on the 1959 Ford, Edsels received the same roof design as the Fairlanes.   Although Fords got a new luxury series of cars midyear, the Galaxie, Edsel never got an equivalent series, further eroding its appeal as a medium price automobile.       

The 1959 Edsel interior dropped several features to increase its commonality with Ford.  The push-button Teletouch transmission controls were withdrawn, alongside the rotating-dome speedometer, as Edsel introduced a slightly restyled version of the Ford Fairlane 500 dashboard (the optional climate control and fully padded dashboard returned).  Alongside the use of distinct interior trim from Ford, Edsel offered a 70/30 split-bench seatback for Corsairs; in 1967, Ford would return the split-bench seatback on the Ford LTD (continuing it into the 2010s on its full-size cars).     

For 1959, Edsel sold 44,891 vehicles in the United States; 2,505 vehicles were sold in Canada.

1960 
For the 1960 model year, Edsel saw its model line reduced further, offering only the Ranger sedans, hardtop, and convertible alongside the Villager station wagon.  Redesigned alongside  1960 Fords, 1960 Edsels were released with far more muted styling than their 1958 namesake.  

Sharing nearly its entire body with Ford, Edsel abandoned its trademark vertical grille in favor of a split grille (similar to the 1959 Pontiac); for the first time, a full-width front bumper was used.  While sharing their tailfins with Ford, the rear fascia of Edsels were distinguished by four oblong vertical taillamps.  Distinguished primarily by their grille and taillamps, the 1960 Edsels were also fitted with model-specific hoods, bumpers, and body-side trim.  The four-door Ranger hardtop had no direct Ford equivalent, as it combined the roofline of the Fairlane with the doors of the Galaxie.

In a design advance, the muffler was relocated from below the passenger compartment to the rear of the car, intended for better muffler protection and less heat and noise intrusion to the passenger compartment.   

1960 Edsels were produced between October 15 and November 19, 1959.  In total, 2,846 vehicles were produced at Louisville Assembly (except for pilot prototypes).

Discontinuation 

Ford announced the end of the Edsel program on November 19, 1959. However, production continued until late in November, with the final tally of 2,846 model year 1960 cars. Total Edsel sales were approximately 116,000, less than half the company's projected break-even point. The company lost $350 million (the equivalent of $ in  dollars) on the venture. Only 118,287 Edsels were built, including 7,440 produced in Oakville, Ontario, Canada. By U.S. auto industry standards, these production figures were dismal, particularly when spread across a run of three model years.

On November 20, 1959, United Press International's (UPI) wire service reported that book values for used Edsels had declined by as much as $400 based on condition and age immediately following the Ford press release. In some newspaper markets, dealers scrambled to renegotiate newspaper advertising contracts involving the 1960 Edsel models, while others dropped the name from their dealerships' advertising entirely. Ford issued a statement that it would distribute coupons to customers who purchased 1960 models (and carryover 1959 models) prior to the announcement, valued at $300 to $400 toward the purchase of new Ford products to offset the decreased values. The company also issued credits to dealers for stock unsold or received following the announcement.

Edsel's failure
Historians have advanced several theories in an effort to explain Edsel's failure. Popular culture often faults vehicle styling. Consumer Reports has alleged that poor workmanship was Edsel's chief problem. Marketing experts hold Edsels up as a supreme example of the corporate culture's failure to understand American consumers. Business analysts cite the weak internal support for the product inside Ford's executive offices. According to author and Edsel scholar Jan Deutsch, an Edsel was "the wrong car at the wrong time."

"The aim was right, but the target moved"
Edsels are most notorious for being a marketing disaster. The name "Edsel" became synonymous with the real-life commercial failure of the predicted "perfect" product or product idea.  Similar ill-fated products have often been colloquially referred to as "Edsels." Ford's own Sierra model, which launched almost 25 years later, is often compared to Edsels owing to initial buyer antipathy to their perceived radical styling, even though, unlike Edsels, it ultimately became a sales success.  Since the Edsel program was such a debacle, it gave marketers a vivid illustration of how not to market a product. The principal reason Edsel's failure is so infamous is that Ford did not consider that failure was a possibility until after the cars had been designed and built, the dealerships established, and $400 million invested in the product's development, advertising and launch.  Incredibly, Ford had presumed to invest $400 million (well over $4 billion in 21st century dollars) in developing the new product line without any prior study to determine whether such an investment would be prudent or profitable.

The pre-release advertising campaign promoted the cars as having "more YOU ideas," and the teaser advertisements in magazines revealed only glimpses of the cars through a highly blurred lens or wrapped in paper or under tarps.  In fact, Ford had never test marketed the vehicles or their radical styling concepts with potential buyers prior to either the vehicles' initial development decision or vehicle shipments to their new dealerships.  Edsels were shipped to the dealerships under wraps and remained so on the dealer lots.

The public also had difficulty understanding exactly what Edsels were, primarily because Ford made the mistake of pricing Edsels within Mercury's market price segment. Theoretically, Edsels were conceived to fit into Ford's marketing structure as a mid-price model, with the brand slotted in between  Ford and Mercury. However, when the cars debuted in September 1957, the least expensive Ranger model was priced within $74 of the most expensive and best-trimmed Ford sedan and $63 less than Mercury's base Medalist model. In their mid-range pricing, Edsel's Pacer and Corsair models were more expensive than their ostensibly more costly Mercury counterparts. Edsel's top-of-the-line Citation hardtop sedan was the only model priced to correctly compete with Mercury's mid-range Montclair Turnpike Cruiser model as illustrated in the chart below. Edsel products were priced from $2,484 to $3,766.

Not only was Edsel competing against its own sister divisions, but model for model, buyers did not understand what the cars were supposed to be—a step above the Mercury, or a step below it.

After introduction to the public, Edsels did not live up to their preproduction publicity, even though many new features were offered, such as self-adjusting rear brakes and automatic lubrication.  While Ford's market research had indicated that these and other features would make Edsels attractive to them as car buyers, their selling prices exceeded what buyers were willing to pay. Upon seeing the price for a base model, many potential buyers simply left the dealerships.  Other customers were frightened by the price for a fully equipped top-of-the-line model.

“The wrong car at the wrong time” 

One of the external forces working against the Edsel brand was the onset of an economic recession in late 1957.

Compounding Edsel's problems was that the car had to compete with well-established nameplates from the Big Three such as Pontiac, Oldsmobile, Buick, Dodge, and DeSoto as well as with its sister division Mercury which had never been a stellar sales success. To make matters still worse, as a new make, Edsel had no established brand loyalty with buyers as its competing makes had.

Even if the 1957–1958 recession had not occurred, Edsel would have been entering a shrinking marketplace. In the early 1950s, when the "E" car was in its earliest stages of development, Ford Executive Vice President Ernest R. Breech had convinced Ford management that the medium-priced market segment offered great untapped opportunity. At the time, Breech's assessment was basically correct; in 1955, Pontiac, Buick, and Dodge had sold a combined two million units.  However, by the fall of 1957, when Edsels were introduced, the market had changed drastically. Independent manufacturers in the medium-priced field were drifting to insolvency. Hoping to reverse its losses, Packard acquired Studebaker which was also in financial difficulty. The board decided to stop production under the venerable Packard badge after 1958. The 1957–58 Packards were Studebaker bodied cars using much Packard Styling (also known as "Packardbakers"). Attempting to capitalize on the emerging consumer interest in economy cars, American Motors shifted its focus to its compact Rambler models and discontinued its pre-merger brands, Nash and Hudson, after the 1957 model year. Sales of Chrysler's DeSoto marque dropped dramatically from its 1957 high by over 50% in 1958. When DeSoto sales failed to rebound during the 1959 model year, plans were made in Highland Park to discontinue the nameplate by 1961.

Sales for most car manufacturers, even those not introducing new models, were down. Among domestic makes, only Rambler and Lincoln produced more cars in 1958 than in 1957. Customers started buying more fuel-efficient automobiles, particularly Volkswagen Beetles, which were selling at rates exceeding 50,000 a year in the U.S. from 1957 onward. Edsels were equipped with powerful engines and offered brisk acceleration, but they also required premium fuel, and their fuel economy, especially in city driving, was poor even by late-1950s standards.

Ford Motor Company had conducted the right marketing study, but it came up with the wrong product to fill the gap between Ford and Mercury. By 1958, buyers had become fascinated with economy cars, and a large car like an Edsel was seen as too expensive to buy and own. When Ford introduced the Falcon in 1959, it sold over 400,000 units in its first year. Ford's investment in expanded plant capacity and additional tooling for Edsels helped make the company's subsequent success with the Falcon possible.

By 1965, the market for medium-priced cars had recovered, and this time, Ford had the right car; the Galaxie 500 LTD. The LTD's success led Chevrolet to introduce the Caprice as a mid-1965 upscale trim option on its top-of-the-line Impala four-door hardtop.

"Edsel, a difficult name to place"
The name of the car, Edsel, is also often cited as a further reason for its lack of popularity. Naming the vehicle after Edsel Ford was proposed early in its development. However, the Ford family strongly opposed its use.  Henry Ford II declared that he did not want his father's good name spinning around on thousands of hubcaps. Ford also ran internal studies to decide on a name, and even dispatched employees to stand outside movie theaters to poll audiences as to what their feelings were on several ideas. They reached no conclusions.

Ford retained the advertising firm Foote, Cone & Belding to come up with a name.  When the agency issued its report, citing over 6,000 possibilities, Ford's Ernest Breech commented that they had been hired to develop one name, not 6,000. Early favorites for the name brand included Citation, Corsair, Pacer, and Ranger, which were ultimately chosen for the vehicle's series names.

David Wallace, manager of marketing research, and coworker Bob Young unofficially invited freethinker poet Marianne Moore for input and suggestions. Moore's unorthodox contributions (among them "Utopian Turtletop," "Pastelogram," "Turcotinga," "Resilient Bullet," "Andante con Moto" and "Mongoose Civique") were meant to stir creative thought and were not officially authorized or contractual in nature.

By the instruction of Ernest Breech, who was chairing a board meeting in the absence of Henry Ford II, the car was finally called "Edsel" in honor of Edsel Ford, former company president and son of Henry Ford.

Reliability
Even though Edsels shared basic technology with other Ford cars of the era, a number of issues caused reliability problems, mostly with the 1958 models.  Reports of mechanical flaws with the cars surfaced, due primarily to lack of quality control and confusion of parts with other Ford models. Ford never dedicated a stand-alone factory solely to Edsel model production.  The 1958 Edsels were assembled in both Mercury and Ford factories.  The longer-wheelbase models, Citation and Corsair, were produced alongside the Mercury products, while the shorter-wheelbase models, Pacer and Ranger, were produced alongside Ford products.  Workers assembling Fords and Mercurys often found the task of assembling the occasional Edsel that moved down the line burdensome, because it required them to change tools and parts bins, then switch back to resume assembling Fords or Mercurys after completing assembly on Edsels.  The workers were also expected to accommodate Edsel assembly with no adjustment in their hourly quota of Ford and Mercury production.  Consequently, the desired quality control of the different Edsel models proved difficult to achieve, even when the Fords and Mercurys were satisfactorily assembled on the same lines.  Many Edsels actually left the assembly lines unfinished.  Uninstalled parts were placed in the trunks along with installation instructions for dealership mechanics, some of whom never installed the additional parts at all.  Some dealers did not even receive all the parts.

In the March 1958 issue of Popular Mechanics, 16% of Edsel owners reported poor workmanship, with complaints ranging from faulty welding to power steering failure. In its test car, Popular Mechanics tested for these problems and discovered others, notably a badly leaking trunk during rain, and the odometer showing fewer than actual miles traveled.

Design controversies

Body design 

Edsel's most memorable design feature was its trademark "horsecollar" grille, which was distinct from that of other cars of the period. According to a popular joke at the time, Edsels "resembled an Oldsmobile sucking a lemon"..

According to Thomas E. Bonsall's book, Disaster in Dearborn (2002), it was assistant stylist Bob "Robin" Jones who suggested a vertical motif for the front end of the "E-car".

Edsel's front end bore little resemblance, if any, to the original concept. Roy Brown, the original chief designer on the Edsel project, had envisioned a slender, almost delicate opening in the center. Engineers, fearing engine cooling problems, vetoed the intended design, so a ring design was suggested. Ernest Breech then demanded that the grille be taller and wider, which led to the "horsecollar".
The vertical grille, after being improved for the 1959 models, was discontinued for the 1960 models, which were similar to Ford models of the same year, although coincidentally, the new front end was very similar to that of the 1959 Pontiac.

Complaints also surfaced about the taillights on 1958 Edsel station wagons. The lenses were boomerang-shaped and placed in a reverse fashion.  At a distance, they appeared as arrows pointed in the opposite direction of the turn being made. When the left turn signal flashed, its arrow shape pointed right, and vice versa. However, there was little that could be done to give the Ford-based station wagons a unique appearance from the rear, because corporate management had insisted that no sheetmetal could be changed. Only the taillights and trim could be touched. There was room for separate turn signals in addition to the boomerangs, but the U.S. industry had never supplied them up to that point, and they were probably never seriously considered.

Powertrain features 
The Teletouch pushbutton automatic transmission selector was an extremely complex feature.  It proved problematic in part because the steering wheel hub, where the pushbuttons were located, was the traditional location of the horn button.  Some drivers inadvertently shifted gears when they intended to sound the horn.  While Edsels were fast, the location of the transmission pushbuttons was not conducive to street racing. There were also jokes among stoplight drag racers about the buttons: D for Drag, L for Leap, and R for Race (instead of Drive, Low and Reverse).  The control wires for Teletouch were also routed too close to the exhaust manifold, which often caused unpredictable movement of the selector mechanism and, in some cases, complete failure. The electrical design required drivers to shift from Park to Reverse to Neutral to Drive, in that order, to avoid overloading the Teletouch motor. The motor was also not powerful enough to bring the car out of Park while on a hill, so dealerships would instruct drivers to set the parking brake before pushing the Park button.

Mechanics of the time were wary of the 410-cubic-inch Edsel "E-475" engine because its perfectly flat cylinder heads lacked distinct combustion chambers.  The heads were set at an angle, with "roof" pistons forming both a squish zone on one side and a combustion chamber on the other.   Combustion thus took place entirely within the cylinder bore.  This design was similar to Chevrolet's 348-cubic-inch "W" engine, which was also introduced in 1958.  While the design reduced the cost of manufacture and may also have helped minimize carbon buildup, it was also unfamiliar to many mechanics.

Company politics and the role of Robert McNamara

Following World War II, Henry Ford II retained Robert McNamara as one of the "Whiz Kids" to help turn Ford around. McNamara's cost-cutting and cost-containment skills helped Ford emerge from its near-collapse after the war. As a result, McNamara eventually amassed a considerable amount of power at Ford. McNamara was very much a throwback to Henry Ford in that, like the elder Ford, McNamara was committed to the Ford marque to the almost total exclusion of the company's other products.  Thus, McNamara had little use for the Continental, Lincoln, Mercury and Edsel brand cars made by the company.

McNamara opposed the formation of the separate divisions for Continental, Lincoln, Mercury, and Edsel cars, and moved to consolidate Lincoln, Mercury, and Edsel into the M-E-L division. McNamara saw to it that the Continental program was canceled and that the model was merged into the Lincoln range for 1958. He next set his sights on Edsel by maneuvering for elimination of the dual wheelbases and separate bodies used for 1958.  Instead, Edsels would share the Ford platform and use Ford's inner body structure for 1959. By 1960, Edsels emerged as little more than a Ford with different trim. McNamara also moved to reduce Edsel's advertising budget for 1959, and for 1960, he virtually eliminated it. The final blow came in the fall of 1959, when McNamara convinced Henry Ford II and the rest of Ford's management that Edsel was doomed and that it was time to end production before Edsel bled the company dry.  McNamara also attempted to discontinue the Lincoln nameplate, but that effort ended with Elwood Engel's now classic redesign of 1961.  McNamara left Ford when he was named Secretary of Defense by President John F. Kennedy.

During the 1964 presidential election, Republican nominee Barry Goldwater blamed McNamara, then Secretary of Defense, for Edsel's failure.  Eventually, Ford's former executive vice president Ernest R. Breech, who was a financial contributor to Goldwater, wrote to the Senator's campaign, explaining that "Mr. McNamara ... had nothing to do with the plans for the Edsel car or any part of the program."  However, the charge continued to be leveled against McNamara for years. During his time as head of the World Bank, McNamara instructed his public affairs officer to distribute copies of Breech's letter to the press whenever the accusation was made.

The Ho Chi Minh Museum in Hanoi features an Edsel crashing through a wall, intended to symbolically represent US military failure in the Vietnam War.  McNamara became the US Secretary of Defense after his career at Ford, and oversaw the escalation of the US military presence in Vietnam.

Vehicles produced

Epilogue

Edsels as Mercurys

Comet 

While Edsel would cost Ford over $250 million (in 1958 dollars), the project would see longer-term benefits for the company, as Ford invested over $100 million to build compact cars over the 1960s.

Prior to the closure of the Edsel division, the brand was intending to release the Edsel Comet compact for the 1960 model year, sharing a body with the Ford Falcon.  Running prototypes of sedans and station wagons were developed into November 1959 (only days before the closure of Edsel).  The design was approved for production, with the Comet sold by Lincoln-Mercury under no divisional branding.  Though sharing chassis underpinnings and many body stampings with the Falcon, the Comet was stretched to a  wheelbase (longer than the GM Y-body "senior compacts").  The Comet adopted multiple design features from the full-size Edsel line, including its oblong taillamp lenses (though canted diagonally, creating its rear tailfins) along with the instrument cluster.  Comet keys were styled like Edsel keys (restyling the "E" emblem as a "C").

While sold without divisional branding, the Comet proved successful; Lincoln-Mercury sold more 1960 Comets than the entire Edsel model line sold through its 1958–1960 existence.  For 1962, the Comet was branded as a Mercury; the model line was produced through 1977.

Meteor 
For 1961, Lincoln-Mercury introduced the Mercury Meteor as its entry-level full-size sedan, slotted below the Mercury Monterey.  Beginning life as a design for the 1961 Edsel Ranger, the base trim of the Meteor was designed with oblong taillamps (switching to horizontal layout), derived from the 1960 Ranger and Comet (designed as an Edsel).  For 1962, the full-size Meteor was discontinued, with Mercury shifting the nameplate to its newly-introduced intermediate car line (becoming a counterpart of the Ford Fairlane through 1963).

Design influence 
While the Edsel trademark vertical grille saw a nearly universal negative response by contemporary buyers and critics, multiple subsequent automobile manufacturers have employed narrow vertically-oriented grilles with greater success in the marketplace, including Pontiac, Jaguar, Subaru, Lancia, Alfa Romeo, and Saab; the BMW 4 Series (G22) is a contemporary model line with a vertical grille generating a negative critical response similar to the Edsel.    

Through technological advances, multiple features introduced by Edsel cars, including self-adjusting brakes, automatic climate control, steering wheel-mounted transmission controls, and childproof rear door locks are no longer impractical ideas, but included in many current production features as options or standard equipment.

Collectors
More than half a century after its spectacular failure, Edsels have become highly collectible items among vintage car hobbyists. Fewer than 10,000 Edsels survive and they are considered valuable collector's items. A mint-condition Edsel convertible from any of its three model years may sell for over $100,000. The rarest Edsel (by body style) is the 1960 Ranger convertible: only 76 were built. Approximately 25 survive today. The rarest Edsel by model is the 1960 Ranger deluxe interior 4-door hardtop, model 57B. Originally intended to be released as the 1960 Corsair, only 31 units were produced.

Plastic scale models of all three Edsel years were produced by Aluminum Metal Toys (AMT), in its familiar 1/25 scale.  Both promotional and kit versions were sold.  These command premium prices today, especially the rare 1959 and 1960 models.  The 1958 Pacer hardtop was re-issued as a totally new and much more detailed kit by AMT in the 1990s.  The 1960 hardtop is also available as a resin kit from several resin model producers, but is typically priced close to the cost of an original kit.  Yat Ming, a producer of diecast model cars, offered a nicely detailed 1958 Citation in 1/18 scale in both hardtop and convertible body styles.  Yat Ming also produced a detailed 1/43 scale diecast of the Citation convertible in several color combinations.  The Franklin Mint produced highly detailed 1/24 scale and 1/43 scale diecast models of the 1958 Citation convertible.  The Danbury Mint produced a 1/24 scale diecast replica of the 1958 Bermuda station wagon, complete with accurately detailed wood trim.

NASCAR
Despite lack of sales success, several Edsels were nevertheless raced in NASCAR's Grand National series in the late 1950s.

References

Further reading
 
 
 Brooks, John. "The Fate of the Edsel" in Business Adventures. New York: Open Road, 2014 edition, .
 
 
 Dicke, Tom. "The Edsel: Forty Years as a Symbol of Failure," Journal of Popular Culture, June 2010, Vol. 43 Issue 3, pp 486–502

External links

 Edsel.com History, specifications, resources for owners.
 Smith Motor Company Virtual Edsel Dealer
 The International Edsel Club
 Edsels in the Media Listing of Edsel references in popular culture.
 Edsel Promo Time A Web site devoted to plastic dealer promotional models of Edsels.
 Washington Post article about the Edsel 
 The Edsel Tinsmith A catalog of tin toy Edsels that were manufactured in Japan
 "All About Ford's Luxury Loaded Edsel." Popular Science, September 1957, pp. 98–103/282-283.

Ford Motor Company
Car manufacturers of the United States
1960s cars
Companies based in Detroit
1958 establishments in Michigan
Cars introduced in 1958
1959 disestablishments in the United States
American brands
Defunct brands
Ford Motor Company Marques
Business failures
1950s cars
Products and services discontinued in 1959